Aidan Kohn-Murphy (born ) is an American social media content creator and political activist best known as the founder of Gen-Z for Change, a non-profit advocacy organization that uses social media to promote civil discourse and political action among members of Generation Z.

TikTok activism
Gen-Z for Change began in 2020 with Kohn-Murphy creating the TikTok account "TikTok for Biden" to support the presidential bid of Joe Biden. As of August 2022 it is a registered 501(c)(4) organisation with a core team of 15–20 people and a coalition of over 500 content creators and activists, which together have 540 million followers and receive 1.5 billion monthly views on social media. It has been the subject of significant news coverage, especially after coordinating a one-hour briefing with the White House for 30 prominent TikTok content creators about the United States’ strategic goals regarding the war in Ukraine, which was parodied by Saturday Night Live.

Reaction
Kohn-Murphy himself is featured prominently in this coverage, in part because of his young age (he was 16 when he created the TikTok for Biden account). Many articles characterise him as politically precocious, and the first news coverage of his political activism is a 2011 Washington Post article about then-seven-year-old Kohn-Murphy's testimony before a D. C. Council Committee of the Whole, Youth Issues hearing, against the ban of chocolate milk in Washington, D.C.'s public schools. Kohn-Murphy was also interviewed by The New York Times in 2022 as president of the Georgetown Day School's Student Staff Council regarding controversy over anti-racism teaching in schools, unrelated to his work with Gen-Z for Change. A biographical article on Kohn-Murphy partly attributes his activism and prominence to his parents' political savvy; his mother directs the legal clinics at George Washington University, and his father served as a former D.C. Mayor’s chief of staff and is Georgetown University’s vice president for government relations and community engagement.

Personal life 
Kohn-Murphy lives in Washington, D.C. He currently attends Harvard University in Cambridge, Massachusetts.

References 

Living people
Year of birth missing (living people)
American political activists
Activists from Washington, D.C.
21st-century American people
Social media influencers
American TikTokers
Georgetown Day School alumni